Slot, the slot or Slots may refer to:

People
 Arne Slot (born 1978), Dutch footballer
 Gerrie Slot (born 1954), Dutch cyclist
 Hanke Bruins Slot (born 1977), Dutch politician
 Tonny Bruins Slot (born 1947), Dutch association football coach who is known for his analyses of matches and opponents
 Jørgen Slots, a Danish-born periodontist in the United States
 Margareta Slots (died 1669), Dutch-born mistress of Gustav II Adolf of Sweden

Arts, entertainment, and media
 Slot (band), a Russian alternative/nu metal band
 Slot, abbreviation of St. Laurence O'Toole Pipe Band, a pipe band based in Dublin, Ireland
 Dance slot, an imaginary narrow rectangle along which a follower moves back and forth with respect to the leader
 The Slot (TV series), an Australian television series

Sport
 Slot (ice hockey), the area on the hockey rink directly ahead of the goaltender between the faceoff circles on each side
 Slot, a space within a formation during a game of American football; see Glossary of American football

Technology
 Signals and slots, language construct used to simplify observer pattern implementations in signal programming and especially GUI design
 Slot (computer architecture), the operation issue and data path machinery associated with a single execute pipeline in a CPU
 Expansion slot, portion of a computer mother board that can receive an expansion card
 Kensington Security Slot, a small hole found on almost all recent small or portable computer and electronics equipment used for attaching a lock
 Leading-edge slot, a fixed aerodynamic feature of the wing of some aircraft to reduce the stall speed
 Slot antenna, a directional antenna consisting of a slot in a piece of metal

Other uses
 Landing slot, a right allocated to an airline by an airport or government agency to schedule a landing or departure at a specific time
 Train slot, a license allocated to a rail transport company
 Mail slot or letter box, a receptacle for receiving incoming mail
 Orbital slot, an allotted position for a satellite in a "crowded" orbit
 Slot machine, a type of casino game
 Slot man or The slot, slang term for the chief copy editor on a newspaper
 "The Slot" or New Georgia Sound, a sound in the Solomon Islands known to Allied combatants during World War II
 The Slot, a gay hotel and sex club featured in the Folsom Street Fair in San Francisco

See also
 
 
 Groove (engineering), a feature cut into a hard material to provide a location for another component
 Hole (disambiguation)
 Slat (disambiguation)
 Slet (disambiguation)
 Slit (disambiguation)
 Slut (disambiguation)
 Tongue and groove, a type of joinery employing slots and interlocking ridges cut into material